The Kentuckians is a lost 1921 American silent drama film directed by Charles Maigne and written by Frank Tuttle based upon the novel of the same name by John Fox, Jr. The film stars Monte Blue, Wilfred Lytell, Diana Allen, Francis Joyner, J.H. Gilmour, John Miltern, and Thomas S. Brown. The film was released on February 20, 1921, by Paramount Pictures.

Cast 
Monte Blue as Boone Stallard
Wilfred Lytell as Randolph Marshall
Diana Allen as Anne Bruce
Francis Joyner as Mace Keaton 
J.H. Gilmour as Governor
John Miltern as Colton 
Thomas S. Brown as Jake Stallard
J. W. Johnston as Boone's Brother
Russell Parker as Constable
John Carr as Young Keaton
Albert Hewitt as Young Stallard
Eugenie Woodward as Ma Stallard
Wes Jenkins as Uncle Cadmus
Grace Reals as Mrs. Marshall

References

External links

Stills at silenthollywood.com

1921 films
1920s English-language films
Silent American drama films
1921 drama films
Paramount Pictures films
Films directed by Charles Maigne
American black-and-white films
American silent feature films
Lost American films
1921 lost films
Lost drama films
1920s American films